Qingpu Xincheng is a station on Line 17 of the Shanghai Metro. It opened with the rest of Line 17 on 30 December 2017.

History 
The station opened for passenger trial operation on 30 December 2017, concurrent with the opening of the rest of Line 17.

Description 

The station is located at the intersection of Yinggang Road and Waiqingsong Highway in Shanghai's Qingpu District. An underground structure, the station features a concourse level beneath street level, while trains stop one level below the concourse. The concourse can be accessed from four entrances and has fare gates, a customer service counter, and ticket machines. The platform level consists of an island platform, with toilets located on the platform's east end.

Like all stations on Line 17, this station is fully accessible. An elevator connects the street level to the concourse near Exit 1. Another elevator lies within the fare-paid zone, connecting the concourse to the platform.

Exits 
The station has four exits:
 Exit 1: East Yinggang Road
 Exit 2: East Yinggang Road
 Exit 3: East Yinggang Road, Waiqingsong Highway
 Exit 4: exit to sunken plaza, shops

References 

Railway stations in Shanghai
Shanghai Metro stations in Qingpu District
Railway stations in China opened in 2017
Line 17, Shanghai Metro